A rush hour (American English, British English) or peak hour (Australian English) is a part of the day during which traffic congestion on roads and crowding on public transport is at its highest. Normally, this happens twice every weekday: once in the morning and once in the afternoon or evening, the times during which the most people commute. The term is often used for a period of peak congestion that may last for more than one hour.
	
The term is very broad, but often refers specifically to private automobile transportation traffic, even when there is a large volume of cars on a road but not many people, or if the volume is normal but there is some disruption of speed. By analogy to vehicular traffic, the term Internet rush hour has been used to describe periods of peak data network usage, resulting in delays and slower delivery of data packets.

Definition
The name is sometimes a misnomer, as the peak period often lasts more than one hour and the "rush" refers to the volume of traffic, not the speed of its flow. Rush hour may be 5–9 AM (5:00–9:00) and 4–8 PM (sometimes from 4-9 PM) (16:00–20:00 (sometimes from 16:00-21:00)). In many cities over 1 million inhabitants, it sometimes even takes place at noon from 11 AM - 1 PM (11:00-13:00). Peak traffic periods may vary from country to country, city to city, from region to region, and seasonally.

The frequency of public transport service is usually higher in the rush hour, and longer trains or larger vehicles are often used. However, the increase in capacity is often less than the increased number of passengers, due to the limits on available vehicles, staff and, in the case of rail transport, track capacity including platform length. The resulting crowding may force many passengers to stand, and others may be unable to board. If there is inadequate capacity, this can make public transport less attractive, leading to higher car use and partly shifting the congestion to roads.

Transport demand management, such as road pricing or a congestion charge, is designed to induce people to alter their travel timing to minimize congestion. Similarly, public transport fares may be higher during peak periods; this is often presented as an off peak discount for single fares. Season tickets or multi-ride tickets, sold at a discount, are commonly used in rush hours by commuters, and may or may not reflect rush hour fare differentials.

Staggered hours have been promoted as a means of spreading demand across a longer time span—for example, in Rush Hour (1941 film) and by the International Labour Office.

Traffic management by country

Australia and New Zealand

In the morning (6–9am), and evening (4:30–7pm), Sydney, Brisbane and Melbourne, and Auckland and Christchurch are usually the most congested cities in Australia and New Zealand respectively. In Melbourne the Monash Freeway, which connects Melbourne's suburban sprawl to the city, is usually heavily congested each morning and evening. In Perth, Mitchell Freeway, Kwinana Freeway and various arterial roads are usually congested between peak hours, making movement between suburbs and the city quite slow.

Efforts to minimise traffic congestion during peak hour vary on a state by state and city by city basis.

In Melbourne, congestion is managed by means including:
 Inbound transit lanes on busy freeways which are limited to motorcycles and other vehicles with more than one occupant during busy periods.
 Free travel on metropolitan trains before 7am. Passengers must exit the system at their destination station before 7am.
 Dedicated bus lanes on major inner city roads such as Hoddle Street.
 Introduction of dedicated bicycle lanes (often by removing vehicle lanes) in the inner city area to encourage cyclists and deter dual-track vehicles.
 Prohibition of parking along busy roads during peak traffic periods to create an extra lane for traffic.

In Brisbane, congestion is managed by means including:
 Fares for using public transport outside of peak periods (referred to as off-peak) are cheaper than peak period fares. 
 Transport for Brisbane operated bus lines for Translink, Bus upgrade zone) designated lines increase their frequency from every 15-minutes to every 10 minutes between 7am and 9am, and between 4:30pm and 6:30pm.
 Busways in Brisbane grade separate a significant amount of bus traffic, particularly on the South and Eastern suburbs using the South East Busway, the Eastern Busway (connects with the South East Busway at Buranda), with some relief on the northern suburbs provided by the Northern Busway. This reduces the traffic load shared by buses and other vehicles, therefore allowing for more capacity for other vehicles on major trunk roads in and out of Brisbane.
 Some specific peak-hour only bus services are denoted by a "P" prefix where only fares are accepted by tapping on with a go card, with no cash-paid ticket sales. These services may also be noted as having the suffix 
"(Rocket)" in timetables, where many inner city suburb stops may be bypassed. 
 On some Queensland Rail operated lines for Translink, increase frequency from every 30 minutes to as frequent as every 6 minutes, between 6:45am and 7:45am and from 4:45pm to 5:45pm during peak times. Most notable on the Caboolture, Ipswich & Rosewood, Redcliffe Peninsula and Springfield lines.
 On the Caboolture, Sunshine Coast and Redcliffe Peninsula line, trains may run express to reduce travel time. A notable example is the trains on the Cabooolture and Sunshine Coast lines run express from Petrie to Bowen Hills, stopping only at Northgate, Eagle Junction and Bowen Hills; previously before the timetable changes, average commute time from Caboolture to Central was 1 hour and 6 minutes. After the timetable changes, it was reduced to 51 minutes, a saving of 15 minutes. 
 Introduction of the South East Bikeway, which runs alongside the South East Busway to allow for cycle commuting from the Southern suburbs. Some paths along the Brisbane River are also widened to include a specific bikeway section (particularly between Toowong and North Quay). 
 Prohibition of parking along busy roads during peak traffic periods to create an extra lane for traffic.

In Sydney, congestion is managed by many means including:
 Buses increase frequency from 4 per hour to 12 per hour on the Metrobus network, other routes increase limited and express services
 The Sydney Trains network runs double-decker electric multiple unit trains that allowed many more passengers to board the trains compared to the 1950s single-level 'Red Rattlers', and 'Silver Ghosts'.
 Time-of-day ticket prices allow train commuters to board trains before 6 am or after 7 pm at a cheaper rate on single or day return tickets
 Transit and/or HOV Lanes are installed on many major arterial roads, 
 The Rail Clearways Program, which allows for broken-down trains on the Sydney Trains network to not affect the running of trains on separate lines due to building bypasses, and loop-backs alongside the existing track
 The Inner West Light Rail, which was the first operational light rail line in Sydney, increases headways during peak hour, providing services up to every eight minutes.

Traffic congestion is managed through the Traffic Management Centre via a network of Closed Circuit TV's, with operators able to change the timing of traffic signals to reduce wait times
 Most major motorways have the ability for contraflow lane to allow continuing flow of traffic in case of a major accident
 Older motor ways have been upgraded from two lanes in each direction, to three lanes in each direction
 Motor way toll booths have been replaced with electronic toll systems (M2 Hills Motorway was the last to do so on 21 January 2012); time-of-day tolling is in use on the Sydney Harbour Bridge and Sydney Harbour Tunnel to provide cash incentives for commuters to remain out of the city in peak times.

Brazil
In São Paulo, Brazil, each vehicle is assigned a certain day of the week in which it cannot travel the roads during rush hour (7–10 am and 5–8 pm). The day of the week for each vehicle is derived from the last digit in the licence plate number and the rule is enforced by traffic police (1 and 2 for Mondays, 3 and 4 for Tuesdays, 5 and 6 for Wednesdays, 7 and 8 for Thursdays and 9 and 10 for Fridays). This policy is aimed at reducing the number of vehicles on the roads and encouraging the use of buses, subway and the urban train systems.

Canada
In Toronto, rush hour typically lasts from 6:30-9:30 in the morning and later from 3pm until about 7pm. Montreal, however, has rush hour times from 6:30–8:30 am and 3:30–5 pm.

In the cities of Edmonton and Calgary, rush hour typically lasts from 7–9 am and begins again at 2:30–6 pm. The overwhelming traffic causes significant delays on freeways and commuter routes, most notably being Anthony Henday Drive in Edmonton, where the province has committed to widening, and Deerfoot Trail in Calgary. Edmonton's Whitemud Drive and Yellowhead Trail are also notable as the busiest freeways after the Anthony Henday Drive (Yellowhead being only about 75% freeway, although construction is ongoing until completion), whereas Calgary's Crowchild Trail and under-construction Stoney Trail are the busiest after Deerfoot. Both cities and Alberta are working on ways to improve traffic flow such as widening, interchange improvements, and collector-distributor systems being proposed for the Anthony Henday Drive and Stoney Trail, respectively.

Vancouver's portion of the Trans-Canada Highway is served with high-occupancy vehicle lanes in addition to standard lanes for all automobiles. These lanes are meant to improve traffic flow by encouraging carpooling and transit use. Richmond, part of the Vancouver metro region,  is also constructing a new interchange at the Stevenson Highway and British Columbia Highway 99 which will be the first of its kind in British Columbia in effort improve traffic flow.

Kelowna's Harvey Avenue is served also by HOV lanes, although residents have criticized their existence as redundant and unneeded because of Kelowna's population. The City of Kelowna has since reduced their times from all day, every day, to 7am-7pm, Monday to Friday. Rush hour is usually from 7am-9am, as well as 3pm-5pm.

China 

China is home to some of the busiest subway networks in the world. Despite aggressive expansion of rapid transit networks in the past decade, rapid urban population growth has put heavy demand on urban transport. Some systems routinely restrict station entrances and transfer passages to prevent the network from being overwhelmed. For example, 96 subway stations in the Beijing Subway have entry restrictions at some point of the day.  The Guangzhou Metro has 51 stations with passenger flow restrictions.

Colombia
In the pico y placa (peak and license plate) program in Bogotá, drivers of non-commercial automobiles are prevented from driving them during rush hours on certain days of the week. The vehicles barred each day are determined by the last digit of their license plate. The measure is mandatory and those who break it are penalized. The digits banned each day are rotated every year.

Greece
In the capital city of Athens the rush hours are usually 7–10 am and 4–7 pm. During these periods there is congestion in the Athens Mass Transit System, most notably in buses and metro, as well as road traffic. The 6-car trains of Athens Metro carries almost 1.5 million passengers during a typical week day.

Japan

In Japan, the proportion of rail transportation is high compared with the use of automobiles. Rail transport accounts for 27% of all passenger transport in Japan (other examples: Germany (7.7%), United Kingdom (6.4%), United States (0.6%)).  In the Greater Tokyo Area and the Keihanshin metropolitan area there is a dense rail network and frequent service, which accounts for more than half of the passenger transport; most people in the area commute by public transport without using cars.

Railways in the Greater Tokyo Area are traditionally known to be severely congested, with oshiya employed to assist passengers getting on the train. This is gradually being improved by increasing rail capacity and demand management. Train lines in Tokyo have had significant reductions in overcrowding and today run at an average of 163 percent of capacity. This is in contrast to the average loading of 221 percent of designed capacity in 1975 rush-hour trains.

In road transport, the expressways of Japan operate on a beneficiaries-pay principle which imposes expensive toll fees, having the effect of reducing road traffic. Electronic toll collection (ETC) is widespread and discounts during low-traffic periods have been introduced to distribute traffic over a longer period. Road pricing is being considered but has not been introduced, partly because the expressway fee is already very high.

Netherlands
For trains in the Netherlands there is an off-peak discount available, giving a 40% discount. Its validity starts at 9am (until 4am the next morning) on weekdays, and all day at weekends and in July and August. In the case of a group of up to four people, all get the discount even if only one has a pass.

Rail passes not requiring an additional ticket come in two versions:  for a fixed route, and for the whole network. Both are mainly used by commuters. No off-peak discount version of these passes is offered since there is insufficient demand; commuters usually cannot avoid the rush hour.

Philippines

Inside Metro Manila, the Unified Vehicular Volume Reduction Program, popularly known as the "number coding scheme", is implemented by the Metropolitan Manila Development Authority. The program stipulates that vehicles are prohibited from plying all roads within the metropolis, depending on the last digit of their license plates and on the day of the week.

The vehicles are banned from 7am to 7pm. Unlike the public vehicles, the private vehicles have a five-hour window exception which runs from 10am to 3pm. However, the cities of Makati and San Juan do not implement the five-hour window.

This table shows the license plates with numbers ending with its corresponding days:

Exempted from the program are motorcycles, school buses, shuttle buses, ambulances, fire engines, police cars, military vehicles, those carrying a person needing immediate medical attention, and vehicles with diplomatic license plates.

On the other hand, in other places, there are certain policies the municipal or city government are proposing or has implemented for the whole municipality or city.

While most schools are open, peak hours in rapid transit trains on Manila Metro Rail Transit System and Manila Light Rail Transit System, and in commuter trains on Philippine National Railways are 6-9am and 4-8pm.

Singapore
In Singapore, there is a free travel scheme before 7:45 am and 50 cent discount between 7:45 am and 8 am, which applies only if you exit and not enter at the 18 CBD stations. This is an attempt to encourage commuters' travel on the MRT outside the crowded weekday morning peak. Electronic Road Pricing is intended to discourage driving between 7:30 am and 8 pm. In addition, employees were given travel incentives through Travel Smart programme. Peak hours are defined as follows: 7:30–9:30 am and 5–8 pm, with different times for terminal stations.

United Kingdom
In London, Peak Day Travelcards allow travel at all hours. Off-peak Day Travelcards are 20–50% cheaper but are valid for travel only after 9:30am and on weekends. This is an attempt to encourage commuters' travel on the London Underground, Docklands Light Railway, buses, and trams outside of the crowded weekday morning peak. There is a similar system on Transport (Bus and Tyne and Wear Metro) in the Newcastle upon Tyne area. In London, congestion charges are intended to discourage driving between 7 am and 6 pm.

In Manchester, the Metrolink light rail system offers single, return and 'Metromax' daysaver tickets at a reduced price when they are purchased after 9:30 am. This incentive is designed to lure passengers into avoiding the daily crowded conditions at Metrolink stations during rush hour.

For 16–25 Railcard holders, the offer of one-third off ticket prices is valid only after 10 am (unless a minimum fare is paid) or weekends. This restriction does not apply in July and August, the main summer holiday season.

For other Railcards, other restrictions apply; for example, the Family Railcard and Network Railcard cannot be used for peak journeys within London and south-east England.

United States

Efforts to manage transportation demand during rush hour periods vary by state and by metropolitan area. In some states, freeways have designated lanes that become HOV (High-Occupancy Vehicle, aka car-pooling) only during rush hours, while open to all vehicles at other times. In others, such as the Massachusetts portion of I-93, travel is permitted in the breakdown lane during this time. Several states use ramp meters to regulate traffic entering freeways during rush hour. Transportation officials in Colorado and Minnesota have added value pricing to some urban freeways around Denver, the Twin Cities, and Seattle, charging motorists a higher toll during peak periods.

Transit agencies – such as Metro-North serving New York City and WMATA serving Washington, D.C. – often charge riders a higher "peak fare" for travel during the morning and evening rush hour.

Morning rush hour times can range from 6–10 am in cities like New York. Some New York commuters try to be on the road by at least 6am because traffic gets heavy between 6:30 and 10am. Many train commuters leave early to get the best seats on the trains, because by 7am the trains are packed with passengers standing or those who cannot get on. Los Angeles, California has several rush hours, including a midnight rush for night workers. Bus and train service (such as Metrolink) in Los Angeles are limited and tend to be underused, but their use is increasing. In the Chicago area people use Metra Trains, the 'L', and buses.

In Northeast Ohio, near Cleveland, morning rush hour is 7–9 am, with the peak 7:30–8:30 am. Because of Cleveland's compact size, most people can be in Downtown Cleveland within 10–45 minutes. The Greater Cleveland Regional Transit Authority runs buses every half hour or more frequently and some routes have non-stop freeway buses that run during rush hour. Red Line heavy rail service runs every ten minutes, and the Blue, Green, and Waterfront Line light rail service runs every fifteen.

There is also an afternoon rush hour. For example, in the New York City area, the afternoon rush hour can begin as early as 2:30-3pm and last until 7-7:30pm. Some people who live in Connecticut but work in New York often do not arrive home until 7 pm or later. On the other hand, in a smaller city like Cleveland, the afternoon rush hour takes place in a more literal sense such that heavy traffic congestion typically only occurs between 5 and 6 pm. Usually the RTA in Cleveland has an afternoon rush hour schedule like the morning.

The city of Philadelphia is known for its very dangerous Schuylkill Expressway, much of which predates the 1956 introduction of the Interstate Highway System. One of the busiest highways in the country (and state of Pennsylvania) and with the road being highly over capacity, it has become notorious for its chronic congestion, especially during rush hour. Rush hour in Philadelphia is usually as early as 6 am, with many in the Delaware Valley using the Schuylkill to reach Central Philadelphia and some of Philadelphia's western suburbs. The rugged terrain, limited riverfront space covered by the route and narrow spans of bridges passing over the highway have largely stymied later attempts to upgrade or widen the highway. An average 163,000 vehicles use the road daily in Philadelphia County, and an average of 109,000 use the highway in Montgomery County. Its narrow lane and left shoulder configuration, left lane entrances and exits (nicknamed "merge or die"), common construction activity and generally congested conditions have led to many accidents, critical injuries and fatalities, leading to the highway's humorous nickname of the "Surekill Expressway" or in further embellishment, "Surekill Distressway".

Boston and the larger Greater Boston region are notorious for traffic congestion due to the region's high population density, outmoded highway system, and economic growth resulting in a high concentration of corporations with large offices located along major expressways and urban loops (including Route 128, MassPike, I-93, and I-495). Despite the region's compact nature, inbound traffic becomes very heavy on all expressways as early as 6am on a typical weekday morning, making an inbound drive from the suburbs as long as 75 minutes. Improvements brought by the infamous Big Dig project temporarily improved expressway traffic within Boston's city limits, but traffic congestion soon returned, also appearing in areas such as the rapidly-developing Seaport District area of South Boston.

Third rush hour
The term "third rush hour" has been used to refer to a period of the midday in which roads in urban and suburban areas become congested due to numerous people taking lunch breaks using their vehicles. These motorists often frequent restaurants and fast food locations, where vehicles crowding the entrances cause traffic congestion. Active retirees, who travel by automobile to engage in many midday activities, also contribute to the midday rush hour. Areas which have large school-age populations may also experience added congestion due to the large number of school buses and kiss-and-ride traffic that flood the roads after lunch, but before the evening rush hour. In many European countries (e.g., Germany, Austria, Hungary) the schools are only half-day and many people work only half-time too. This causes a third rush hour around 12:30–2 pm, which diverts some traffic from the evening rush hour, thus leaving the morning rush hour the most intense period of the day.

Another usage of "third rush hour" can be to describe congestion later at night (generally between 10–11 pm and 2–3 am the next morning, particularly on Thursdays, Fridays, and Saturdays) of people returning home from nights spent out at restaurants, bars, nightclubs, casinos, concerts, amusement parks, movie theaters, and sporting events. At other times (such as evenings and weekends), additional periods of congestion can be the result of various special events, such as sports competitions, festivals, or religious services. Out-of-the-ordinary congestion can be the result of an accident, construction, long holiday weekends, or inclement weather.

See also

Carpool
Congestion pricing
High occupancy vehicle lane
Road space rationing
Road traffic control
Traffic wave
Ramp meter

Notes 

a. Crowding levels defined by the Ministry of Land, Infrastructure, Transport and Tourism:

100% — Commuters have enough personal space and are able to take a seat or stand while holding onto the straps or hand rails.
150% — Commuters have enough personal space to read a newspaper.
180% — Commuters must fold newspapers to read.
200% — Commuters are pressed against each other in each compartment but can still read small magazines.
250% — Commuters are pressed against each other, unable to move.

References

Public transport
Periodic phenomena
Commuting